The 2022–23 V.League Division 1 Men's is the 29th tournament of the V.League which began from 22 October 2022 to 23 April 2023.

Club

Personnel

Transfer players

Foreign players 
The total number of foreign players is restricted to one per club. Player from Asian Volleyball Confederation (AVC) nations are exempt from these restrictions.

Informal players 
An informal player is a player still in high school or university but given a contract. Informal players are formally registered in V.League Organization and able to play on court.

Competition format

Regular round 
 10 teams participate in round robin system, playing each other team 4 times.
 Teams are ranked in the Regular Round by:
 Wins ->Points ->Set Percentage ->Scoring Rate
 The top four teams from the Regular Round will advance to the Final Stage
 Ranking of 5th to 10th place will be the ranking of the Regular Round and will be the final ranking. The 9th and 10th placed teams will compete in the V.Challenge Match.

Final stage 
 Top 4 teams of Regular Round to compete each other in one robin round to determine rankings.
 To begin with the Final stage, the winner of regular season will be given 3 points, the 2nd team will be given 2 points, the third one will be given 1 point as advantage.
 Teams are ranked in the Final Stage by:
 Wins ->Points ->Set Percentage ->Scoring Rate ->Ranking of Regular Round
 The 3rd and 4th team of Final Stage will be the final ranking for 3rd and 4th place.
 The top 2 teams of Final stage to play against each other in a one match Final.

Season standing procedure 
The teams will be ranked by the total number of victories
The teams will be ranked by the most point gained per match as follows:
Match won 3–0 or 3–1: 3 points for the winner, 0 points for the loser
Match won 3–2: 2 points for the winner, 1 point for the loser
Match forfeited: 3 points for the winner, 0 points (0–25, 0–25, 0–25) for the loser
 If teams are still tied after examining the number of victories and points gained, then the FIVB will examine the results in order to break the tie in the following order:
Set quotient: if two or more teams are tied on total number of victories, they will be ranked by the quotient resulting from the division of the number of all set won by the number of all sets lost.
Points quotient: if the tie persists based on the set quotient, the teams will be ranked by the quotient resulting from the division of all points scored by the total of points lost during all sets.
If the tie persists based on the point quotient, the tie will be broken based on the team that won the match of the Round Robin Phase between the tied teams. When the tie in point quotient is between three or more teams, these teams ranked taking into consideration only the matches involving the teams in question.

Regular round

Regular round standing

Results table

Match results 
 All times are Japan Standard Time (UTC+09:00).

Matchday 1

Matchday 2

Matchday 3

Matchday 4

Matchday 5

Matchday 6

Matchday 7

Matchday 8

Matchday 9

Matchday 10

Matchday 11

Matchday 12

Matchday 13

Matchday 14

Matchday 15

Matchday 16

Matchday 17

Matchday 18

Matchday 19

Final stage

Final four 

* Ranking points of regular round: 1st place–3 point, 2nd place–2 point, 3rd place–1 point, 4th place–0 point.

Matches

Final

Final Match

All-Star 

 VOM:  Bartosz Kurek (Team Billy)

Final standing

Awards

Regular round 

 Best Scorer
 Best Spiker
 Best Blocker
 Best Server
 Best Receiver
Fair Play Award

V.League Honour Award
For playing more than 10 seasons and more than 230 games:
  (Tokyo Great Bears)
  (Panasonic Panthers)
  (JT Thunders Hiroshima)
  (JTEKT Stings)

Outstanding personal records

Final stage 

 Most Valuable Player

 Best Six

 Director Award

 Best Libero

 Receive Award

 Fighting Spirit Award

 Best Newcomer Award

 Matsudaira Yasutaka Award

V.Challenge Match

Qualification 
Division 1 Teams ranked 9th and 10th and Division 2 teams ranked 1st and 2nd.

Teams from Division 2 must obtain S1 license.

Format 
V1 9th place team vs V2 2nd place team
V1 10th place team vs V2 1st place team

Teams to play 2 match system. The winning teams to promote to/ stay in 2023–24 V.League.

The winning team is determined as follow:

Wins ->Points ->Set Percentage ->Scoring Rate -> V.1 Teams

Matches 

Group 1

Group 2

Results

See also 
2022 Emperor's Cup and Empress' Cup

Notes

References

External links 
 Official website 

Men's
V
V
Volleyball
2022 in Japanese sport
2023 in Japanese sport